Tony Powell may refer to:
Tony Powell (cricketer) (born 1972), Jamaican cricketer
Tony Powell (footballer) (born 1947), former English football defender
Tony Powell (sprinter) (full name: Anthony Joseph Burwood Powell) (born 1943), Canadian sprinter
Tony Powell, character in After the Fox